Zwevegem is a municipality located in the Belgian province of West Flanders. The municipality comprises the towns of Heestert, Moen, Otegem, Sint-Denijs and Zwevegem. On January 1, 2019, Zwevegem had a total population of 24,648. The total area is 63.24 km2 which gives a population density of 380 inhabitants per km2.

The Bekaert company was founded in Zwevegem by Baron Leon Leander Bekaert.

Heestert Military Cemetery holds the graves of 127 Britons and 57 Germans, most of whom died on 21–25 October 1918 in the area during the First World War.

Twin towns
Zwevegem is twinned with:

  Lorsch, Germany
  Le Coteau, France

Notable people
 Léon Antoine Bekaert (1891–1961), businessman
 Christian Dumolin, businessman
 Gella Vandecaveye, judoka

References

External links
 
 Official Website 

Municipalities of West Flanders